Joan Gonzàlez Cañellas (born 1 February 2002) is a Spanish professional footballer who plays as a midfielder for  club Lecce.

Career
A youth product of Cornellà, Gonzàlez moved to the youth academy of Barcelona on 5 September 2019. On 19 August 2021, he moved to the youth academy of Lecce. He started training with the senior team of Lecce in the preseason in the summer of 2022, and was promoted to their squad ahead of their season in Serie A in 2022-23 after they achieved promotion.

He made his professional and Coppa Italia debut as a late substitute in a 1–1 tie (3–2 aggregate loss) against Cittadella on 5 August 2022.

Playing style
Gonzàlez was initially trained as a midfielder, before converting to a centre-back at Barcelona, and then back to midfield again at Lecce. He is adept at playmaking from the back with precise passes and often chooses the best passing lane. He can play in a 2 or 3-man midfield, and is a great dribbler with a good sense of position.

Career statistics

References

External links
 
 
 

Living people
2002 births
Footballers from Barcelona
Association football midfielders
Spanish footballers
U.S. Lecce players
Serie A players
Spanish expatriate footballers
Spanish expatriate sportspeople in Italy
Expatriate footballers in Italy